Koukou Angarana is a town in the Kimiti department of the Sila (or Dar Sila) region in southeastern Chad.

Prior to 2008, Koukou Angarana was part of the Ouaddaï Region.

Transport
The town is served by Koukou Angarana Airstrip. Landcruisers are also available for hire. However, road transport is risky and requires local police escort. The roads are also rugged and untarmacked.

External links
 Satellite map at Maplandia

Populated places in Chad
Sila Region